Ebenholz is a village of Liechtenstein, located in the municipality of Vaduz. Its name means "ebony" in German.

Geography
The village lies in the center of the country, just in the north of Vaduz, and south of Schaan, close to the village of Mühleholz.

Economy
Orca Engineering is a Swiss-founded and Ebenholz-based sports car maker, which produces one of the fastest cars in the world, the R113.

References

Villages of Liechtenstein
Geography of Vaduz